A camel is a hoofed mammal.

Camel may also refer to:

People
 Camel Meriem (born 1979), French footballer
 Marvin Camel (born 1951), WBC and IBF world cruiserweight boxing champion
 The Camel, nickname of Murray Humphreys (1899–1965), American mobster
 The Camel, nickname of Hugh Trenchard, 1st Viscount Trenchard (1873–1956), Marshal of the First Royal Air Force

Places
 River Camel, a river in Cornwall, United Kingdom
 Camel Nunataks, two rock nunataks in Antarctica
 Camel Rock (disambiguation), two places

Vehicles
 Sopwith Camel, a fighter aircraft
 Sproule-Ivanoff Camel, a one-off 1930s British glider
 Tupolev Tu-104, NATO reporting name Camel
 HMS Camel, seven ships of the Royal Navy
 USS Camel, two ships of the US Navy
 Camel, a South Devon Railway Buffalo class locomotive

Computing
 Apache Camel, a Java-based integration framework
 Customized Applications for Mobile networks Enhanced Logic, a set of mobile telephone network standards

Entertainment

Music
The Camel (Idrees Sulieman album), 1964
 Camel (band), an English progressive rock band formed in 1971
 Camel (album), their first (1973) studio album

Television
 "The Camel" (Parks & Recreation), an episode of the television show Parks and Recreation

Sports
 Camel spin, a figure skating move
 Connecticut College Camel, the mascot of Connecticut College
 Wadebridge Camels, a rugby union team in Cornwall, United Kingdom
 Camel Trophy, a rally competition
 Camel Cup, an annual camel racing festival held in Australia
 Campbell Fighting Camels and Lady Camels, the nicknames of the sports teams of Campbell University
 Hapoel Be'er Sheva F.C., nicknamed "The Camels".

Other uses
 Camel (chess), a fairy chess piece
 Camel (cigarette), American cigarette brand manufactured by R.J Reynolds Tobacco Company
 Camel (color)
 Camel (horse), an English thoroughbred racehorse
 CAMELS rating system, a safety rating system for banks, co ops, and credit unions
 Ship camel, an external flotation tank to lift ships

See also
 Battle of the Camel, fought at Basra in 656
 Tuoshan, translated as "Camel Mountain", a mountain in Shandong Province, China
 CAML (disambiguation)